Chabanivka (pronounced: Tscha-ba-novka) is a village in Uzhhorod Raion, Zakarpattia Oblast, Ukraine.

It was part of the Kingdom of Hungary (11th century - 1918 and 1938-1944) with the name of Bačsava in the Ungvári járás (district) and Ung megye (county), next part of Czechoslovakia (1918-1938) with the name of Bačovo in Podkarpatská Rus (Sub-Carpathia), then part of the Soviet Union (Ukraine) (1945-1993) with the name of Čsabanyivka in the Uzhhorod (district) and since 1993 known as Chabanivka in the Uzhhorod Raion (district) and the Zakarpats'ka Oblast (county) of Ukraine.

Other spellings/names for Chabanivka are: Bacsó, Batčhive, Čhabanowka, Tschabaniwka, and Tschabanowka. In Yiddish, Chabanivka was referred to as Batscheve.

Chabanivka is located 15 miles SE of Uzhhorod, 8 miles WNW of Mukacheve.

Villages in Uzhhorod Raion